Canadian Special Operations Forces Command (CANSOFCOM) is a command of the Canadian Armed Forces. It is responsible for all special forces operations that are capable of responding to terrorism and threats to Canadians and Canadian interests around the world.

CANSOFCOM's primary mission is counter-terrorism, which involves conducting rigorous and specialized training and working with local law enforcement agencies, as required, to protect Canadians from the threat of terrorism.

Commander CANSOFCOM reports directly to the Chief of the Defence Staff. The leadership of the CAF and the Department of National Defence maintain full oversight on all CANSOFCOM operations.

Composition
CANSOFCOM is organized into a headquarters element and five units:
 
Joint Task Force 2 (JTF 2); 
Canadian Special Operations Regiment (CSOR); 
427 Special Operations Aviation Squadron (SOAS); 
Canadian Joint Incident Response Unit (CJIRU); 
Canadian Special Operations Training Centre (CSOTC).

Operational tasks

CANSOFCOM has five strategic tasks:

 Provide advice on special operations to the chief of the defence staff (CDS) and other CAF operational commanders
 Generate deployable, high-readiness special operations forces (SOF) capable of deploying as part of a broader CAF operation, or independently
 Conduct and command SOF operations on behalf of the CDS
 Continuously develop SOF capabilities and tactics
 Maintain and promote relationships with Canadian security partners and allied special operations forces

In support of these strategic tasks, CANSOFCOM personnel are organized, trained, equipped, and always ready to conduct operational tasks. 

These tasks include:
 Hostage rescue
 Direct action
 Chemical, biological, radiological and nuclear (CBRN) crisis response
 Sensitive site exploitation
 Combating weapons of mass destruction
 Maritime special operations
 Support to non-combatant evacuation operations
 Special protection operations
 Defence, diplomacy and military assistance

Special operations task forces

CANSOFCOM employs an integrated operating concept that combines the capabilities of all units in a special operations task force (SOTF) capable of completing assigned missions and tasks. Therefore, depending on the tasks at hand, various combinations of personnel from JTF2, CSOR, 427 SOAS and CJIRU are assembled into a SOTF, as appropriate, to accomplish assigned missions.

The commander selects which task force or team will be deployed based on several criteria, including:
 The scope of the problem; 
 The required response time; 
 What effect needs to be achieved; and 
 The level of precision required.

Based on the requirement to respond to specific standing tasks assigned to the CAF by the Government of Canada, such as responding to a terrorist attack, an international crisis or a CBRN threat, CANSOFCOM has developed several standing SOTFs:
 Immediate Response Task Force (IRTF). The IRTF is the highest-readiness task force available to the Government of Canada; it is deployed on extremely short notice to address issues that could affect national interests. It is composed of personnel from all CANSOFCOM units and is led by JTF2. Its primary focus is counter-terrorism operations, domestic or international. 
 Tasks include hostage rescue, direct action, CBRN response, sensitive-site exploitation, counter-proliferation, and maritime special operations. 
 Chemical, Biological, Radiological and Nuclear (CBRN) Task Force. This task force is based on the personnel and capabilities of CJIRU and includes the CANSOFCOM contribution to Canada's National CBRNE Response Team, led by the RCMP. The CBRN Task Force provides a short-notice response to crisis or major events within Canada and is primarily focused on counter-terrorism that involves chemical, biological, radiological or nuclear elements. It provides technical response to CBRN incidents and can be enabled by the capabilities of other CANSOFCOM units as required. At the request of the Government of Canada, the CBRN Task Force can also conduct counter-proliferation operations and be deployed internationally. 
 Tasks include reconnaissance, surveillance, sampling, limited decontamination for task force personnel and sensitive-site exploitation. 
 Task Force Arrowhead. TF Arrowhead is a scalable, agile force able to respond to threats and incidents around the globe on short notice. While it is internationally focused, it can also be deployed in Canada. It is a high-readiness SOTF capable of quickly deploying to a crisis for short periods of time. It is composed of personnel from all four units in the command and is led by CSOR. TF Arrowhead represents an initial response that could be a precursor to the deployment of another SOTF or conventional task force. 
 Tasks include direct action, CBRN response, sensitive-site exploitation, counter-proliferation and support to non-combatant evacuation operations, special protection operations. 
 SOF teams. Small teams of CANSOFCOM personnel perform tasks that fall outside the scope of the three standing task forces. SOF teams generally deploy for short periods, typically not longer than six months. SOF teams are made up of personnel and capabilities from all four units. 
 Tasks include defence, diplomacy and military assistance, strategic advice, planning and liaison, strategic reconnaissance and security support to operations of other Government of Canada organizations.

The IRTF, CBRN Task Force, Task Force Arrowhead and the SOF teams do not represent the full extent of CANSOFCOM capabilities; CANSOFCOM is capable of generating additional forces for specific needs as required.

Commanding officers

Uniform
With operational uniforms, all members of CANSOFCOM wear the tan beret, regardless of their environment (Navy, Army or Air Force), with the badge of their personnel branch or, in the case of the Royal Canadian Armoured Corps and Royal Canadian Infantry Corps members, the badge of their former regiment.

In 2017 the Special Operations Forces Branch began to wear service dress uniforms that are distinct from the Navy, Army and Air Force. The uniform consists of a dark olive five-button jacket, light olive trousers bloused over black jump boots, light khaki shirt and olive tie, and a tan beret.

See also

 Canadian Joint Operations Command (CJOC) – Canadian brother unit
 United States Special Operations Command (USSOCOM) – American equivalent command
 United Kingdom Special Forces (UKSF) – British equivalent command
 Special Operations Command (Australia) (SOCOMD) – Australian equivalent command
 Kommando Spezialkräfte (KSK) – German equivalent command

Notes and references

External links
 Official CANSOFCOM Webpage.
 The Standing Committee on National Security and Defence Evidence, November 20, 2006
 No Ordinary Men - SOF Missions in Afghanistan - Bernd Horn

Canadian Special Operations Force Command
Military units and formations established in 2006
Canadian Armed Forces